Maria Śliwka (born Serkiz, later Panek, later Śliwka, on 7 December 1935; died 30 March 1997) was a Polish volleyball player. She was a member of Poland women's national volleyball team in 1957–1964, a bronze medalist of the Olympic Games Tokyo 1964, a bronze medalist of the World Championship 1962 and medalist of the European Championship (silver in 1963, bronze in 1958).

Career as player

National team
Her first medal she won bronze of European Championship 1958 held in Czechoslovakia. In 1962 she won bronze medal of World Championship, and one year later silver of European Championship 1963. In 1964 she took part in Olympic Games Tokyo 1964. She played in all five matches and Poland, including Śliwka, won bronze medal in the Olympic tournament. Śliwka played in national team 118 times.

External links
 
 

1935 births
1997 deaths
People from Biłgoraj
Sportspeople from Lublin Voivodeship
Polish women's volleyball players
Volleyball players at the 1964 Summer Olympics
Olympic volleyball players of Poland
Olympic medalists in volleyball
Olympic bronze medalists for Poland
Medalists at the 1964 Summer Olympics